A White Lady is a type of female ghost, typically dressed in a white dress or similar garment.

White Lady may also refer to:

Arts and entertainment
 White Lady (album), by Badger, 1974
 White Lady (1987 film), a 1987 British television film by David Rudkin in the anthology series ScreenPlay
 White Lady (film), a 2006 Philippines film

Fictional characters 

White Lady of Gont or Tenar, a fictional character in Ursula K. Le Guin's Earthsea novels
White Lady of Rohan or Éowyn, a fictional character created by J. R. R. Tolkien
The White Lady, a character from the video game Hollow Knight

Species
 White lady (butterfly) or Graphium morania, a species of butterfly found in southern Africa
 White lady (plant) or Kalanchoe tetraphylla, a species of plant found in southern Africa
 White lady (spider) or Leucorchestris arenicola, a species of spider found in Namibia

Other uses
 White Lady (cocktail), a sour type of drink
The White Lady (Namibia), a rock painting in Namibia
 The White Lady (Ireland), a standing stone

See also

 Dame Blanche (disambiguation)
 Lady in White (disambiguation)
 White Witch (disambiguation)
 White Woman (disambiguation)
 The Woman in White (disambiguation)
 Order of the White Lady (France)

Animal common name disambiguation pages